Astrakhan Oblast is a federal subject of Russia (an oblast) located in southern Russia. Its administrative center is the city of Astrakhan. As of the 2010 Census, its population was 1,010,073.

Geography

Astrakhan is traversed by the northeasterly line of equal latitude and longitude.  Its southern border is the Caspian Sea, eastern is Kazakhstan (Atyrau Region and West Kazakhstan Region), northern is Volgograd Oblast, and western is Kalmykia.

It is within the Russian Southern Federal District.

History
Astrakhan region is the homeland of the Buzhans, one of several Slavic tribes from which modern Russians evolved.
They lived in Southern Russia and inhabited the area around the Buzan river. Buzan oblast was created on December 27, 1943, on parts of the territories of the abolished Kalmyk ASSR and Astrakhan Okrug of Stalingrad Oblast. Starting from the 16th century, Indians had moved to the region causing the region to be under Indian influence.
August–December 1942, the Germans reached the edge of the Astrakhansky Oblast and crossed the edges into the Region, the Abwehr from 1942 to 1943 and Nazi Army stragglers, 1941–44.

Project Vega

From October 8, 1980 to October 27, 1984, and under the leadership of Nikolai Baibakov, the USSR held fifteen deep underground nuclear tests for Nuclear Explosions for the National Economy at the site Vega in the Ryn Desert in the east of the oblast less than 50 km from downtown Astrakhan to create reservoirs for natural gas storage. Because of the detonation depth (975 to 1,100 meters) and relatively low yield (3.2 to 13.5 kilotons), no radiation was released to the environment. These blasts had lower yields than the Project Sapphire blasts, which were 40 km south-southwest of Orenburg, to reduce any possible seismic destruction to nearby towns in the Volga delta including Astrakhan. At that time, the natural gas fields near Astrakhan, which are at a depth of 3900 to 4,100 meters, could contain as much as 6 trillion cubic meters, which is an amount similar to Urengoy. The deposit is operated by Gazprom Dobycha Astrakhan which is a wholly owned subsidiary of Gazprom. The field produces large amounts of sulfur, too.

Modern history
On 30 October 1997, Astrakhan, alongside Kirov, Murmansk, Ulyanovsk, and Yaroslavl signed a power-sharing agreement with the government of Russia, granting it autonomy. The agreement would be abolished on 21 December 2001.

Politics

During the Soviet period, the high authority in the oblast was shared between three persons: The first secretary of the Astrakhan CPSU Committee (who in reality had the biggest authority), the chairman of the oblast Soviet (legislative power), and the Chairman of the oblast Executive Committee (executive power). Since 1991, CPSU lost all the power, and the head of the Oblast administration, and eventually the governor was appointed/elected alongside elected regional parliament.

The Charter of Astrakhan Oblast is the fundamental law of the region. The Legislative Assembly of Astrakhan Oblast is the province's standing legislative (representative) body. The Legislative Assembly exercises its authority by passing laws, resolutions, and other legal acts and by supervising the implementation and observance of the laws and other legal acts passed by it. The highest executive body is the Oblast Administration, which includes territorial executive bodies such as district administrations, committees, and commissions that facilitate development and run the day to day matters of the province. The Oblast administration supports the activities of the Governor who is the highest official and acts as guarantor of the observance of the oblast Charter in accordance with the Constitution of Russia.

Administrative divisions

Demographics

Population 

Life expectancy:
According to Rosstat.

Settlements

Ethnic groups 
According to the 2021 Census, the ethnic composition was:

(shown are the ethnic groups with a population of more than 5,000 people)

144,459 people were registered from administrative databases, and could not declare an ethnicity. It is estimated that the proportion of ethnicities in this group is the same as that of the declared group.

Vital statistics 

Births (2008): 14,200 (14.2 per 1000)
Deaths (2008): 13,660 (13.6 per 1000) ДЕМОГРАФИЧЕСКАЯ СИТУАЦИЯ
Births: 15,304 (15.1 per 1000)
Deaths: 12,783 (12.6 per 1000)

Total fertility rate:

2009 – 1.77 | 2010 – 1.76 | 2011 – 1.78 | 2012 – 1.93 | 2013 – 1.91 | 2014 – 1.97 | 2015 – 1.97 | 2016 – 1.93(e)

Languages
The local group of Russian varieties is known as Astrakhan Russian and refers to several dialects spoken in and around the Astrakhan Oblast.

Religion

According to a 2012 survey which interviewed 56,900 people 46% of the population of Astrakhan Oblast adheres to the Russian Orthodox Church, 4% are Orthodox Christian believers who do not belong to any church or are members of other (non-Russian) Orthodox churches, 2% are unaffiliated generic Christians, 14% are Muslims, and 2% of the population adheres to the Slavic native faith (Rodnovery) or other folk religions of the region. In addition, 16% of the population declares to be spiritual but not religious, 6% is atheist, and 10% follows other religions or did not give an answer to the question.

Smaller religious communities not represented in the poll cited above but present in the region include Hindus, Jews and Buddhists, each having one temple in Astrakhan Oblast.

See also
Astrakhan Khanate
Music of Astrakhan
Elections in Astrakhan Oblast
List of Chairmen of the Astrakhan Oblast Duma
Hinduism in Russia

Notes

References

Sources

External links

 Official website of Astrakhan Oblast 

 
Southern Federal District
States and territories established in 1943